Kimberley School (formally Kimberley Comprehensive School) is a secondary school in Kimberley, Nottinghamshire, England. It has  academy status. Part of the East Midlands Education Trust, it has many feeder schools in the Kimberley/Nuthall area. It has opened a new multi-million pound sixth form centre in September 2020. The school has 4 houses: Boot, Clough, Lawrence, and Nightingale all named after famous people from the Nottinghamshire/Derbyshire area.

International
The school has links with another in Burkina. The schools in Burkina Faso, like in England, are free but the government cannot afford to deliver this assurance to all the Burkinabé children. Unlike England you are much more likely to receive an education if you are a boy.

BBC School Report 
Some Year 8's from Kimberley School have taken part in the BBC's school report project, for the past few years. They have been visited by such local personalities as: Francis Finn, local radio presenter from BBC Radio Nottingham.

Family of schools
Kimberleys school family is Awsworth Primary, Gilthill Primary, Hollywell Primary, Horsendale Primary, Kimberley Primary, Larkfields Junior, Larkfields Infant and Mornington Primary. Details of the admission rules to the school and its sixth form are published. However the school has room for 1375 pupils.

Notable staff
Paul Rowen M.P. taught science here from 1977-80

References

External links
 Official site
Official site (unarchived)
Get information schools service

Secondary schools in Nottinghamshire
Academies in Nottinghamshire